Ice People is a documentary film directed by Anne Aghion about the research of Allan Ashworth and Adam Lewis  in Antarctica. Produced by Dry Valleys Productions, this 2008 film portrays the scientists discovering fossils from 13.9 million years ago. The film premiered at the San Francisco International Film Festival in April 2008 and was screened at the Jerusalem Film Festival in July 2008. This film aired on Sundance Channel in 2009.

Synopsis

Ice People brings Anne Aghion and her crew to Antarctica where they spent four months following the lives of North Dakota State University geologist professors Allan Ashworth and Adam Lewis, as well as the McMurdo Station staff over four months. The film crew then followed the professors and two undergraduate students into the field where they camped out and shot in conditions of extreme cold and winds that ranged from -50 °C/-60 °F to 0 °C/32 °F.  The film shows the scientific team scouring ancient emptied lakebeds in the hope of finding evidence of plants and insects that would prove that the world's coldest continent was once warm and verdant roughly 14 to 20 million years ago.

References

External links
 Official website
 
 

2008 films
2008 documentary films
Exploration of Antarctica
Documentary films about Antarctica
Documentary films about prehistoric life
Films directed by Anne Aghion
Films set in Antarctica
2000s English-language films